In geometry, the square gyrobicupola is one of the Johnson solids. Like the square orthobicupola, it can be obtained by joining two square cupolae along their bases. The difference is that in this solid, the two halves are rotated 45 degrees with respect to one another.

The square gyrobicupola is the second in an infinite set of gyrobicupolae.

Related to the square gyrobicupola is the elongated square gyrobicupola. This polyhedron is created when an octagonal prism is inserted between the two halves of the square gyrobicupola. It is argued whether or not the elongated square gyrobicupola is an Archimedean solid because, although it meets every other standard necessary to be an Archimedean solid, it is not highly symmetric.

Formulae
The following formulae for volume and surface area can be used if all faces are regular, with edge length a:

Related polyhedra and honeycombs

The square gyrobicupola forms space-filling honeycombs with tetrahedra, cubes and cuboctahedra; and with tetrahedra, square pyramids, and  elongated square bipyramids. (The latter unit can be decomposed into elongated square pyramids, cubes, and/or square pyramids).

References

External links
 

Johnson solids